Keilor East is a suburb in Melbourne, Victoria, Australia,  north-west of Melbourne's Central Business District, located within the Cities of Brimbank and Moonee Valley local government areas. Keilor East recorded a population of 15,078 at the 2021 census.

Keilor East is bounded in the west by the Maribyrnong River in the City of Brimbank, in the north by the Calder Freeway, in the east by Hoffmans Road, and in the south by Buckley Street, Steele Creek and Rosehill Road.

History

Keilor East Post Office opened on 1 July 1947. This was renamed Niddrie in 1956, and a new Keilor East office opened in November 1957. Lincolnville Post Office on McFarlane Street opened in 1964 and closed in 1988.

Keilor East was previously located in the former City of Keilor, though now sits partially in the City of Brimbank (west of the Albion-Jacana railway line) and the remainder in the City of Moonee Valley (east of the Albion-Jacana railway line).

Commerce

Keilor East contains the Milleara Shopping Centre (previously named and still commonly known as Milleara Mall), on the corner of Milleara Road and Buckley Street, as well as the small Centreway Shopping Centre and Dinah Parade shopping strip.

Centreway Shopping Centre's claim to fame is that it was the home of the original JB Hi-Fi store founded by John Barbuto.

Transport

East Keilor is served by five bus routes:
406: to Footscray, operated by CDC Melbourne
407: Highpoint Shopping Centre – Avondale Heights, operated by CDC Melbourne
465: Essendon station – Keilor Park, operated by Ryan Brothers Bus Service
469: to Moonee Ponds Junction, operated by Kastoria Bus Lines
 903: Altona station – Mordialloc, operated by Kinetic Melbourne

Keilor East railway station is a proposed station on the proposed Melbourne Airport line. This line will run to Melbourne Airport, and will open in 2029. There will be approximately a 27-minute travel time to the Melbourne CBD, via Sunshine and the Metro Tunnel.

Large parts of the suburb are under the flight path of the nearby Melbourne Airport which is curfew-free.

Education

Keilor East has a public primary school, Keilor Heights Primary School, St. Peters School, a private primary school, a campus of the public secondary school Essendon Keilor College, and the senior campus of the private Uniting Church school Penleigh and Essendon Grammar School.

Keilor East had many more schools in the 1980s and 1990s, such as Lincolnville Primary School, Keilor South Primary School and Overland Primary School. Lincolnville and Keilor South merged in 1988 to form Rosehill Park Primary School (on the former Keilor South Primary School site). At the end of 1993, Rosehill Park and Overland were forced to close down by the State Liberal Government of Jeff Kennett, with Keilor Heights absorbing most of their students.

Notable people from Keilor East
 Shane Jacobson – of the movie Kenny and television shows Kenny's World and co-host of Top Gear Australia
 John Barbuto – founder of JB Hi-Fi
 Tina Arena – singer
 Damien Peverill – footballer

Sporting facilities
 East Keilor Football Club, an Australian Rules football team, competes in the Essendon District Football League.
 East Keilor Cricket Club
 East Keilor Leisure Centre
 St Peters Parish Tennis Club (closed)
 East Keilor Tennis Club.

See also
 City of Keilor – Keilor East was previously within this former local government area.

References

Suburbs of Melbourne
Suburbs of the City of Moonee Valley
Suburbs of the City of Brimbank